The following is an episode list for the History Channel television series History's Lost & Found. The series premiered on August 7, 1999 and ended its run on September 4, 2005. In total, 65 episodes were produced during four seasons. A number of episodes were released onto VHS. One was released onto DVD.

Series overview 
{| class="wikitable plainrowheaders" style="text-align: center;"
|-
! style="padding: 0px 8px;" colspan="2" rowspan="2"| Season
! style="padding: 0px 8px;" rowspan="2"| Episodes
! colspan="3" style="padding: 0px 8px;"| Originally aired
! style="padding: 0px 8px;"| DVD release dates
|-
! scope="col" style="padding: 0px 8px;"| Season premiere
! scope="col" style="padding: 0px 8px;"| Season finale
! scope="col" style="padding: 0px 8px;"| Network
! scope="col" style="padding: 0px 8px;"| Region 1
|-
 |style="background-color: #FFA6C9;"|
 ! scope="row" style="text-align:center;"|1
 |3
 |
 |
 |rowspan="4"|The History Channel
 |
|-
 |style="background-color: #d8342b;"|
 ! scope="row" style="text-align:center;"|2
 |60
 |
 |
 |
|-
 |style="background-color: #ff7e00;"|
 ! scope="row" style="text-align:center;"|3
 |2
 |
 |
 |
|-
 |style="background-color: #FFF44F;"|
 ! scope="row" style="text-align:center;"|4
 |1
 |
 |
 |
|-
|}

Episodes

Season 1: 1999

Season 2: 2000

Season 3: 2004

Season 4: 2005

References

History's Lost and Found